Most of the terms listed in Wikipedia glossaries are already defined and explained within Wikipedia itself. However, glossaries like this one are useful for looking up, comparing and reviewing large numbers of terms together. You can help enhance this page by adding new terms or writing definitions for existing ones.

This glossary of calculus is a list of definitions about calculus, its sub-disciplines, and related fields.

A

B

C

D

E

F

G

H

I

J

L

M

N

O

P

Q

R

S

T

U

V

W

See also 
 Outline of calculus
 Glossary of areas of mathematics
 Glossary of astronomy
 Glossary of biology
 Glossary of botany
 Glossary of chemistry
 Glossary of ecology
 Glossary of engineering
 Glossary of physics
 Glossary of probability and statistics

References

Notes

C
Wikipedia glossaries using description lists